Onconotus is a genus of bush cricket in the subfamily Tettigoniinae. It is the only representative of the monotypic tribe Onconotini and species have been recorded from eastern Europe and western Asia.

Species
It contains the following species:
 Onconotus laxmanni (Pallas, 1771) - type species
 Onconotus marginatus (Fabricius, 1798)
 Onconotus servillei Fischer von Waldheim, 1846

References 

Tettigoniidae genera
Taxonomy articles created by Polbot